Charlie Teagarden (July 19, 1913 – December 10, 1984), known as 'Smokey Joe', was an American jazz trumpeter. He was the younger brother of Jack Teagarden. His nickname was Little T.

Born in Vernon, Texas, United States, Teagarden worked locally in Oklahoma before he and Jack joined Ben Pollack's Orchestra in 1929. Pollack's recordings were Teagarden's first. He then worked with Red Nichols (1931) and Roger Wolfe Kahn (1932) before doing an extended run in Paul Whiteman's orchestra (1933–40). In 1936 he, Jack, and Frankie Trumbauer played together in the ensemble The Three T's.

Teagarden played in his brother's big band in 1940, but soon branched off to lead his own ensembles. He played with Jimmy Dorsey in 1948-50 and Bob Crosby from 1954–58, as well as working with Pete Fountain in the 1960s. He worked steadily in Las Vegas after 1959. His only release as a leader was issued in 1962 on Coral Records. At the 1963 Monterey Jazz Festival, he performed with Jack, sister Norma, and mother Helen. Teagarden went into semi-retirement in the 1970s.

Teagarden died on December 10, 1984 in Las Vegas, Nevada.

Notes

References
Scott Yanow, [ Charlie Teagarden] at AllMusic

External links
 Charlie Teagarden recordings at the Discography of American Historical Recordings

1913 births
1984 deaths
People from Vernon, Texas
American jazz trumpeters
American male trumpeters
20th-century American musicians
20th-century trumpeters
Jazz musicians from Texas
20th-century American male musicians
American male jazz musicians
The Charleston Chasers members